The following is a list of birds of Aruba. The avifauna of Aruba has 245 confirmed species, of which six have been introduced by humans and 111 are rare or vagrants (including three species introduced elsewhere in the region). Two have been extirpated. None are endemic.  Two additional species are hypothetical (see below).

Except as an entry is cited otherwise, the list of species is that of the South American Classification Committee (SACC) of the American Ornithological Society. The list's taxonomic treatment (designation and sequence of orders, families, and species) and nomenclature (common and scientific names) are also those of the SACC.

The following tags have been used to highlight certain categories of occurrence.

 (V) Vagrant - a species that rarely or accidentally occurs in Aruba
 (I) Introduced - a species introduced to Aruba as a consequence, direct or indirect, of human actions
 (H) Hypothetical - a species recorded but with "no tangible evidence" according to the SACC

Ducks
Order: AnseriformesFamily: Anatidae

Anatidae includes the ducks and most duck-like waterfowl, such as geese and swans. These birds are adapted to an aquatic existence with webbed feet, flattened bills, and feathers that are excellent at shedding water due to an oily coating.

Fulvous whistling-duck, Dendrocygna bicolor (V)
White-faced whistling-duck, Dendrocygna viduata (V)
Black-bellied whistling-duck, Dendrocygna autumnalis
Muscovy duck, Cairina moschata (I)
Comb duck, Sarkidiornis silvicola (V)
Northern shoveler, Spatula clypeata
Blue-winged teal, Spatula discors
Cinnamon teal, Spatula cyanoptera (V)
American wigeon, Mareca americana
White-cheeked pintail, Anas bahamensis
Northern pintail, Anas acuta (V)
Green-winged teal, Anas crecca (V)
Ring-necked duck, Aythya collaris (V)
Lesser scaup, Aythya affinis
Masked duck, Nomonyx dominicus (V)

New World quails
Order: GalliformesFamily: Odontophoridae

The New World quails are small, plump terrestrial birds only distantly related to the quails of the Old World, but named for their similar appearance and habits.

Crested bobwhite, Colinus cristatus

Flamingos
Order: PhoenicopteriformesFamily: Phoenicopteridae

Flamingos filter-feed on shellfish and algae. Their oddly shaped beaks are specially adapted to separate mud and silt from the food they consume and, uniquely, are used upside-down.

American flamingo, Phoenicopterus ruber

Grebes
Order: PodicipediformesFamily: Podicipedidae

Grebes are small to medium-large freshwater diving birds. They have lobed toes and are excellent swimmers and divers. However, they have their feet placed far back on the body, making them quite ungainly on land..

Least grebe, Tachybaptus dominicus
Pied-billed grebe, Podilymbus podiceps

Pigeons
Order: ColumbiformesFamily: Columbidae

Pigeons and doves are stout-bodied birds with short necks and short slender bills with a fleshy cere.

Rock pigeon, Columba livia (I)
Scaly-naped pigeon, Patagioenas squamosa (extirpated)
Bare-eyed pigeon, Patagioenas corensis
White-tipped dove, Leptotila verreauxi
Eared dove, Zenaida auriculata
Common ground dove, Columbina passerina

Cuckoos
Order: CuculiformesFamily: Cuculidae

The family Cuculidae includes cuckoos, roadrunners, and anis. These birds are of variable size with slender bodies, long tails, and strong legs.

Greater ani, Crotophaga major (V)
Smooth-billed ani, Crotophaga ani (V)
Groove-billed ani, Crotophaga sulcirostris
Yellow-billed cuckoo, Coccyzus americanus
Mangrove cuckoo, Coccyzus minor (V)

Oilbird
Order: SteatornithiformesFamily: Steatornithidae

The oilbird is a slim, long-winged bird related to the nightjars. It is nocturnal and a specialist feeder on the fruit of the oil palm.

Oilbird, Steatornis caripensis (V)

Nightjars
Order: CaprimulgiformesFamily: Caprimulgidae

Nightjars are medium-sized nocturnal birds that usually nest on the ground. They have long wings, short legs, and very short bills. Most have small feet, of little use for walking, and long pointed wings. Their soft plumage is camouflaged to resemble bark or leaves.

Common nighthawk, Chordeiles minor
Antillean nighthawk, Chordeiles gundlachii (V)
Little nightjar, Setopagis parvula (V)
White-tailed nightjar, Hydropsalis cayennensis
Chuck-will's-widow, Antrostomus carolinensis (V)

Swifts
Order: ApodiformesFamily: Apodidae

Swifts are small birds which spend the majority of their lives flying. These birds have very short legs and never settle voluntarily on the ground, perching instead only on vertical surfaces. Many swifts have long swept-back wings which resemble a crescent or boomerang.

White-collared swift, Streptoprocne zonaris (V)
Vaux's swift, Chaetura vauxi (V)
Chimney swift, Chaetura pelagica

Hummingbirds
Order: ApodiformesFamily: Trochilidae

Hummingbirds are small birds capable of hovering in mid-air due to the rapid flapping of their wings. They are the only birds that can fly backwards.

White-necked jacobin, Florisuga mellivora (V)
Ruby-topaz hummingbird, Chrysolampis mosquitus
Blue-tailed emerald, Chlorostilbon mellisugus

Limpkin
Order: GruiformesFamily: Aramidae

The limpkin resembles a large rail. It has drab-brown plumage and a grayer head and neck.

Limpkin, Aramus guarauna (V)

Rails
Order: GruiformesFamily: Rallidae

Rallidae is a large family of small to medium-sized birds which includes the rails, crakes, coots, and gallinules. Typically they inhabit dense vegetation in damp environments near lakes, swamps, or rivers. In general they are shy and secretive birds, making them difficult to observe. Most species have strong legs and long toes which are well adapted to soft uneven surfaces. They tend to have short, rounded wings and are weak fliers.

Purple gallinule, Porphyrio martinica
Sora, Porzana carolina
Common gallinule, Gallinula galeata
American coot, Fulica americana

Plovers
Order: CharadriiformesFamily: Charadriidae

The family Charadriidae includes the plovers, dotterels, and lapwings. They are small to medium-sized birds with compact bodies, short thick necks, and long, usually pointed, wings. They are found in open country worldwide, mostly in habitats near water.

American golden-plover, Pluvialis dominica
Black-bellied plover, Pluvialis squatarola
Southern lapwing, Vanellus chilensis
Killdeer, Charadrius vociferus
Semipalmated plover, Charadrius semipalmatus
Wilson's plover, Charadrius wilsonia
Collared plover, Charadrius collaris
Snowy plover, Charadrius nivosus (V)

Oystercatchers
Order: CharadriiformesFamily: Haematopodidae

The oystercatchers are large and noisy plover-like birds, with strong bills used for smashing or prising open molluscs.

American oystercatcher, Haematopus palliatus

Avocets and stilts
Order: CharadriiformesFamily: Recurvirostridae

Recurvirostridae is a family of large wading birds which includes the avocets and stilts. The avocets have long legs and long up-curved bills. The stilts have extremely long legs and long, thin, straight bills.

Black-necked stilt, Himantopus mexicanus

Sandpipers
Order: CharadriiformesFamily: Scolopacidae

Scolopacidae is a large diverse family of small to medium-sized shorebirds including the sandpipers, curlews, godwits, shanks, tattlers, woodcocks, snipes, dowitchers and phalaropes. The majority of these species eat small invertebrates picked out of the, mud or soil. Variation in length of legs and bills enables multiple species to feed in the same habitat, particularly on the coast, without direct competition for food.

Upland sandpiper, Bartramia longicauda (V)
Whimbrel, Numenius phaeopus
Hudsonian godwit, Limosa haemastica (V)
Ruddy turnstone, Arenaria interpres
Red knot, Calidris canutus (V)
Ruff, Calidris pugnax (V)
Stilt sandpiper, Calidris himantopus
Curlew sandpiper, Calidris ferruginea (V)
Sanderling, Calidris alba
Baird's sandpiper, Calidris bairdii (V)
Least sandpiper, Calidris minutilla
White-rumped sandpiper, Calidris fuscicollis
Buff-breasted sandpiper, Calidris subruficollis
Pectoral sandpiper, Calidris melanotos
Semipalmated sandpiper, Calidris pusilla
Western sandpiper, Calidris mauri
Short-billed dowitcher, Limnodromus griseus
Long-billed dowitcher, Limnodromus scolopaceus (V)
Wilson's snipe, Gallinago delicata
Spotted sandpiper, Actitis macularius
Solitary sandpiper, Tringa solitaria
Greater yellowlegs, Tringa melanoleuca
Willet, Tringa semipalmata
Lesser yellowlegs, Tringa flavipes

Jacanas
Order: CharadriiformesFamily: Jacanidae

The jacanas are a group of waders found throughout the tropics. They are identifiable by their huge feet and claws which enable them to walk on floating vegetation in the shallow lakes that are their preferred habitat.

Wattled jacana, Jacana jacana (V)

Skuas
Order: CharadriiformesFamily: Stercorariidae

The family Stercorariidae are, in general, medium to large birds, typically with gray or brown plumage, often with white markings on the wings. They nest on the ground in temperate and arctic regions and are long-distance migrants.

South Polar skua, Stercorarius maccormicki (V)
Pomarine jaeger, Stercorarius pomarinus (V)
Parasitic jaeger, Stercorarius parasiticus (V)
Long-tailed jaeger, Stercorarius longicaudus (V)

Skimmers
Order: CharadriiformesFamily: Rynchopidae

Skimmers are a small family of tropical tern-like birds. They have an elongated lower mandible which they use to feed by flying low over the water surface and skimming the water for small fish.

Black skimmer, Rynchops niger

Gulls
Order: CharadriiformesFamily: Laridae

Laridae is a family of medium to large seabirds and includes gulls, kittiwakes, and terns. They are typically gray or white, often with black markings on the head or wings. They have stout, longish bills and webbed feet. Terns are a group of generally medium to large seabirds typically with gray or white plumage, often with black markings on the head. Most terns hunt fish by diving but some pick insects off the surface of fresh water. Terns are generally long-lived birds, with several species known to live in excess of 30 years.

Laughing gull, Leucophaeus atricilla
Franklin's gull, Leucophaeus pipixcan (V)
Ring-billed gull, Larus delawarensis (V)
Great black-backed gull, Larus marinus (V)
Lesser black-backed gull, Larus fuscus (V)
Herring gull, Larus argentatus (V)
Brown noddy, Anous stolidus
Black noddy, Anous minutus
Sooty tern, Onychoprion fuscatus
Bridled tern, Onychoprion anaethetus
Least tern, Sternula antillarum
Large-billed tern, Phaetusa simplex (V)
Gull-billed tern, Gelochelidon nilotica
Caspian tern, Hydroprogne caspia (V)
Black tern, Chlidonias niger
Common tern, Sterna hirundo
Roseate tern, Sterna dougallii
Forster's tern, Sterna forsteri (V)
Sandwich tern, Thalasseus sandvicensis
Royal tern, Thalasseus maximus

Tropicbirds
Order: PhaethontiformesFamily: Phaethontidae

Tropicbirds are slender white birds of tropical oceans with exceptionally long central tail feathers. Their heads and long wings have black markings.

Red-billed tropicbird, Phaethon aethereus (V)

Southern storm-petrels
Order: ProcellariiformesFamily: Oceanitidae

The storm-petrels are relatives of the petrels and are the smallest seabirds. They feed on planktonic crustaceans and small fish picked from the surface, typically while hovering. The flight is fluttering and sometimes bat-like.

Wilson's storm-petrel, Oceanites oceanicus (V)

Shearwaters
Order: ProcellariiformesFamily: Procellariidae

The procellariids are the main group of medium-sized "true petrels", characterized by united nostrils with medium septum and a long outer functional primary.

Black-capped petrel, Pterodroma hasitata (V)
Bulwer's petrel, Bulweria bulwerii (V)
Cory's shearwater, Calonectris diomedea (V)
Audubon's shearwater, Puffinus lherminieri (V)

Storks
Order: CiconiiformesFamily: Ciconiidae

Storks are large, long-legged, long-necked, wading birds with long, stout bills. Storks are mute, but bill-clattering is an important mode of communication at the nest. Their nests can be large and may be reused for many years. Many species are migratory.

Wood stork, Mycteria americana (V)

Frigatebirds
Order: SuliformesFamily: Fregatidae

Frigatebirds are large seabirds usually found over tropical oceans. They are large, black-and-white, or completely black, with long wings and deeply forked tails. The males have colored inflatable throat pouches. They do not swim or walk and cannot take off from a flat surface. Having the largest wingspan-to-body-weight ratio of any bird, they are essentially aerial, able to stay aloft for more than a week.

Magnificent frigatebird, Fregata magnificens
Great frigatebird, Fregata minor (V)

Boobies
Order: SuliformesFamily: Sulidae

The sulids comprise the gannets and boobies. Both groups are medium to large coastal seabirds that plunge-dive for fish.

Masked booby, Sula dactylatra
Red-footed booby, Sula sula
Brown booby, Sula leucogaster

Cormorants
Order: SuliformesFamily: Phalacrocoracidae

Phalacrocoracidae is a family of medium to large coastal, fish-eating seabirds that includes cormorants and shags. Plumage coloration varies, with the majority having mainly dark plumage, some species being black-and-white, and a few being colorful.

Neotropic cormorant, Phalacrocorax brasilianus

Pelicans
Order: PelecaniformesFamily: Pelecanidae

Pelicans are large water birds with a distinctive pouch under their beak. As with other members of the order Pelecaniformes, they have webbed feet with four toes.

Brown pelican, Pelecanus occidentalis

Herons
Order: PelecaniformesFamily: Ardeidae

The family Ardeidae contains the bitterns, herons, and egrets. Herons and egrets are medium to large wading birds with long necks and legs. Bitterns tend to be shorter necked and more wary. Members of Ardeidae fly with their necks retracted, unlike other long-necked birds such as storks, ibises, and spoonbills.

Pinnated bittern, Botaurus pinnatus (V)
Least bittern, Ixobrychus exilis
Black-crowned night-heron, Nycticorax nycticorax
Yellow-crowned night-heron, Nyctanassa violacea
Green heron, Butorides virescens
Striated heron, Butorides striata (V)
Cattle egret, Bubulcus ibis
Great blue heron, Ardea herodias
Great egret, Ardea alba
Whistling heron, Syrigma sibilatrix (V)
Tricolored heron, Egretta tricolor
Reddish egret, Egretta rufescens
Little egret, Egretta garzetta (V)
Snowy egret, Egretta thula
Little blue heron, Egretta caerulea

Ibises
Order: PelecaniformesFamily: Threskiornithidae

Threskiornithidae is a family of large terrestrial and wading birds which includes the ibises and spoonbills. They have long, broad wings with 11 primary and about 20 secondary feathers. They are strong fliers and despite their size and weight, very capable soarers.

White ibis, Eudocimus albus (V)
Scarlet ibis, Eudocimus ruber (V)
Glossy ibis, Plegadis falcinellus
White-faced ibis, Plegadis chihi (V)
Roseate spoonbill, Platalea ajaja

New World vultures
Order: CathartiformesFamily: Cathartidae

The New World vultures are not closely related to Old World vultures, but superficially resemble them because of convergent evolution. Like the Old World vultures, they are scavengers. However, unlike Old World vultures, which find carcasses by sight, New World vultures have a good sense of smell with which they locate carrion.

Black vulture, Coragyps atratus (V)
Turkey vulture, Cathartes aura (V)

Osprey
Order: AccipitriformesFamily: Pandionidae

The family Pandionidae contains only one species, the osprey. The osprey is a medium-large raptor which is a specialist fish-eater with a worldwide distribution.

Osprey, Pandion haliaetus

Hawks
Order: AccipitriformesFamily: Accipitridae

Accipitridae is a family of birds of prey, which includes hawks, eagles, kites, harriers, and Old World vultures. These birds have powerful hooked beaks for tearing flesh from their prey, strong legs, powerful talons, and keen eyesight.

White-tailed kite, Elanus leucurus (V)
Swallow-tailed kite, Elanoides forficatus (V)
Snail kite, Rostrhamus sociabilis (V)
Northern harrier, Circus hudsonius (V)
White-tailed hawk, Geranoaetus albicaudatus (V)

Owls
Order: StrigiformesFamily: Strigidae

The typical owls are small to large solitary nocturnal birds of prey. They have large forward-facing eyes and ears, a hawk-like beak and a conspicuous circle of feathers around each eye called a facial disk.

Burrowing owl, Athene cunicularia

Kingfishers
Order: CoraciiformesFamily: Alcedinidae

Kingfishers are medium-sized birds with large heads, long pointed bills, short legs, and stubby tails.

Ringed kingfisher, Megaceryle torquata (V)
Belted kingfisher, Megaceryle alcyon
Amazon kingfisher, Chloroceryle amazona (V)

Woodpeckers
Order: PiciformesFamily: Picidae

Woodpeckers are small to medium-sized birds with chisel-like beaks, short legs, stiff tails, and long tongues used for capturing insects. Some species have feet with two toes pointing forward and two backward, while several species have only three toes. Many woodpeckers have the habit of tapping noisily on tree trunks with their beaks.

Yellow-bellied sapsucker, Sphyrapicus varius (V)

Falcons
Order: FalconiformesFamily: Falconidae

Falconidae is a family of diurnal birds of prey. They differ from hawks, eagles, and kites in that they kill with their beaks instead of their talons.

Crested caracara, Caracara plancus
Yellow-headed caracara, Milvago chimachima
American kestrel, Falco sparverius
Merlin, Falco columbarius
Aplomado falcon, Falco femoralis (V)
Peregrine falcon, Falco peregrinus

Old World parrots
Order: PsittaciformesFamily: Psittaculidae

Characteristic features of parrots include a strong curved bill, an upright stance, strong legs, and clawed zygodactyl feet. Many parrots are vividly colored, and some are multi-colored. Old World parrots are found from Africa east across south and southeast Asia and Oceania to Australia and New Zealand.

Rose-ringed parakeet, Psittacula krameri (I)

New World and African parrots
Order: PsittaciformesFamily: Psittacidae.

Parrots are small to large birds with a characteristic curved beak. Their upper mandibles have slight mobility in the joint with the skull and they have a generally erect stance. All parrots are zygodactyl, having the four toes on each foot placed two at the front and two to the back.

Yellow-shouldered parrot, Amazona barbadensis (extirpated)
Brown-throated parakeet, Eupsittula pertinax

Tyrant flycatchers
Order: PasseriformesFamily: Tyrannidae

Tyrant flycatchers are passerine birds which occur throughout North and South America. They superficially resemble the Old World flycatchers, but are more robust and have stronger bills. They do not have the sophisticated vocal capabilities of the songbirds. Most, but not all, have plain coloring. As the name implies, most are insectivorous.

Caribbean elaenia, Elaenia martinica
Small-billed elaenia, Elaenia parvirostris (V)
Mouse-colored tyrannulet, Phaeomyias murina (V)
Cattle tyrant, Machetornis rixosa
Tropical kingbird, Tyrannus melancholicus
Fork-tailed flycatcher, Tyrannus savana
Eastern Kingbird, Tyrannus tyrannus (V)
Gray kingbird, Tyrannus dominicensis
Swainson's flycatcher, Myiarchus swainsoni (V)
Brown-crested flycatcher, Myiarchus tyrannulus
Northern scrub-flycatcher, Sublegatus arenarum
Vermilion flycatcher, Pyrocephalus rubinus (V)
Willow flycatcher, Empidonax traillii (V)
Eastern wood-pewee, Contopus virens (V)

Vireos
Order: PasseriformesFamily: Vireonidae

The vireos are a group of small to medium-sized passerine birds. They are typically greenish in color and resemble New World warblers apart from their heavier bills.

Yellow-throated vireo, Vireo flavifrons (H)
Philadelphia vireo, Vireo philadelphicus (V)
Red-eyed vireo, Vireo olivaceus
Yellow-green vireo, Vireo flavoviridis (V)
Black-whiskered vireo, Vireo altiloquus

Swallows
Order: PasseriformesFamily: Hirundinidae

The family Hirundinidae is adapted to aerial feeding. They have a slender streamlined body, long pointed wings, and a short bill with a wide gape. The feet are adapted to perching rather than walking, and the front toes are partially joined at the base.

Southern rough-winged swallow, Stelgidopteryx ruficollis (V)
Brown-chested martin, Progne tapera (V)
Purple martin, Progne subis (V)
Caribbean martin, Progne dominicensis (V)
Cuban martin, Progne cryptoleuca (H)
Bank swallow, Riparia riparia
Barn swallow, Hirundo rustica
Cliff swallow, Petrochelidon pyrrhonota
Cave swallow, Petrochelidon fulva (V)

Waxwings
Order: PasseriformesFamily: Bombycillidae

The waxwings are a group of birds with soft silky plumage and unique red tips to some of the wing feathers. In the Bohemian and cedar waxwings, these tips look like sealing wax and give the group its name. These are arboreal birds of northern forests. They live on insects in summer and berries in winter.

Cedar waxwing, Bombycilla cedrorum (V)

Thrushes
Order: PasseriformesFamily: Turdidae

The thrushes are a group of passerine birds that occur mainly in the Old World. They are plump, soft plumaged, small to medium-sized insectivores or sometimes omnivores, often feeding on the ground. Many have attractive songs.

Veery, Catharus fuscescens (V)
Wood thrush, Hylocichla mustelina (V)

Mockingbirds
Order: PasseriformesFamily: Mimidae

The mimids are a family of passerine birds that includes thrashers, mockingbirds, tremblers, and the New World catbirds. These birds are notable for their vocalizations, especially their ability to mimic a wide variety of birds and other sounds heard outdoors. Their coloring tends towards dull-grays and browns.

Gray catbird, Dumetella carolinensis (V)
Tropical mockingbird, Mimus gilvus

Starlings
Order: PasseriformesFamily: Sturnidae

Starlings are small to medium-sized passerine birds. Their flight is strong and direct and they are very gregarious. Their preferred habitat is fairly open country. They eat insects and fruit. Plumage is typically dark with a metallic sheen.

European starling, Sturnus vulgaris (introduced to the western hemisphere) (V)

Weavers
Order: PasseriformesFamily: Ploceidae

The weavers are small passerine birds related to the finches. They are seed-eating birds with rounded conical bills. The males of many species are brightly colored, usually in red or yellow and black, some species show variation in color only in the breeding season.

Village weaver, Ploceus cucullatus (introduced to the western hemisphere) (V)

Estrildids
Order: PasseriformesFamily: Estrildidae

The members of this family are small passerine birds native to the Old World tropics. They are gregarious and often colonial seed eaters with short thick but pointed bills. They are all similar in structure and habits, but have wide variation in plumage colors and patterns.

Tricolored munia, Lonchura malacca (introduced to the western hemisphere) (V)

Old World sparrows
Order: PasseriformesFamily: Passeridae

Old World sparrows are small passerine birds. In general, sparrows tend to be small, plump, brown or gray birds with short tails and short powerful beaks. Sparrows are seed eaters, but they also consume small insects.

House sparrow, Passer domesticus (I)

Sparrows
Order: PasseriformesFamily: Passerellidae

Most of the species are known as sparrows, but these birds are not closely related to the Old World sparrows which are in the family Passeridae. Many of these have distinctive head patterns.

Rufous-collared sparrow, Zonotrichia capensis

Blackbirds
Order: PasseriformesFamily: Icteridae

The icterids are a group of small to medium-sized, often colorful, passerine birds restricted to the New World and include the grackles, New World blackbirds, and New World orioles. Most species have black as the predominant plumage color, often enlivened by yellow, orange, or red.

Bobolink, Dolichonyx oryzivorus
Red-breasted meadowlark, Leistes militaris (V)
Venezuelan troupial, Icterus icterus
Baltimore oriole, Icterus galbula (V)
Yellow oriole, Icterus nigrogularis
Shiny cowbird, Molothrus bonariensis
Carib grackle, Quiscalus lugubris (I)
Great-tailed grackle, Quiscalus mexicanus (V)
Oriole blackbird, Gymnomystax mexicanus (V)
Yellow-hooded blackbird, Chrysomus icterocephalus (V)

Wood-warblers
Order: PasseriformesFamily: Parulidae

The wood-warblers are a group of small, often colorful, passerine birds restricted to the New World. Most are arboreal, but some are terrestrial. Most members of this family are insectivores.

Ovenbird, Seiurus aurocapilla
Northern waterthrush, Parkesia noveboracensis
Louisiana waterthrush, Parkesia motacilla (V)
Golden-winged warbler, Vermivora chrysoptera (V)
Blue-winged warbler, Vermivora cyanoptera (V)
Black-and-white warbler, Mniotilta varia
Prothonotary warbler, Protonotaria citrea
Tennessee warbler, Oreothlypis peregrina (V)
Connecticut warbler, Oporornis agilis (V)
Kentucky warbler, Geothlypis formosa (V)
Common yellowthroat, Geothlypis trichas
Hooded warbler, Setophaga citrina
American redstart, Setophaga ruticilla
Cape May warbler, Setophaga tigrina
Northern parula, Setophaga americana
Magnolia warbler, Setophaga magnolia (V)
Bay-breasted warbler, Setophaga castanea (V)
Blackburnian warbler, Setophaga fusca
Yellow warbler, Setophaga petechia
Chestnut-sided warbler, Setophaga pensylvanica
Blackpoll warbler, Setophaga striata
Black-throated blue warbler, Setophaga caerulescens (V)
Palm warbler, Setophaga palmarum (V)
Yellow-rumped warbler, Setophaga coronata (V)
Prairie warbler, Setophaga discolor (V)
Black-throated green warbler, Setophaga virens (V)
Canada warbler, Cardellina canadensis (V)

Cardinal grosbeaks
Order: PasseriformesFamily: Cardinalidae

The cardinals are a family of robust, seed-eating birds with strong bills. They are typically associated with open woodland. The sexes usually have distinct plumages.

Summer tanager, Piranga rubra (V)
Scarlet tanager, Piranga olivacea (V)
Rose-breasted grosbeak, Pheucticus ludovicianus (V)
Blue grosbeak, Passerina caerulea (V)
Indigo bunting, Passerina cyanea
Dickcissel, Spiza americana (V)

Tanagers
Order: PasseriformesFamily: Thraupidae

The tanagers are a large group of small to medium-sized passerine birds restricted to the New World, mainly in the tropics. Many species are brightly colored. They are seed eaters, but their preference tends towards fruit and nectar. Most have short, rounded wings.

Saffron finch, Sicalis flaveola (I)
Bananaquit, Coereba flaveola
Black-faced grassquit, Melanospiza bicolor

See also
List of birds
Lists of birds by region

References

Other reading

Aruba
 
Aruba-related lists